Le Port-Marly is a commune in the outer western suburbs of Paris, France. It is located in the Yvelines department in the Île-de-France region, north of Versailles. In 2019, Le Port-Marly had a population of 5,481.

Population

See also
Château de Monte-Cristo
Communes of the Yvelines department

References

External links
 Town website

Communes of Yvelines